Coenocharopa elegans, the elegant pinwheel snail, is a species of air-breathing land snails in the family Charopidae. It is found in Queensland, Australia.

References

External links 

 Coenocharopa elegans at Biolib.cz
 Coenocharopa elegans at the Atlas of Living Australia

Charopidae
Gastropods described in 2010
Fauna of Queensland
Gastropods of Australia